Te Deum is a sacred choral composition by Karl Jenkins, written in 2008. Te Deum is often performed together with the composer's Gloria.

History 

Jenkins composed the work on a commission by the Liverpool Welsh Choral Union in 2008 when Liverpool was European Capital of Culture. The text chosen for the celebration is the Latin , an early Christian hymn also known as the Ambrosian Hymn. The composer conducted the premiere on 30 November 2008, with the choir and the Royal Liverpool Philharmonic Orchestra, at the Philharmonic Hall. A review noted: 

Te Deum was published in 2009. It takes about 15 minutes to perform.

Scoring and structure 

The piece is scored for mixed choir  and an orchestra of strings, two trumpets and four percussionists, playing timpani, glockenspiel and xylophone, bass drum, cymbal and suspended cymbal, and side drum. The choir is four-part SATB, with the exception of one chord where both women and men are divided in three groups. Compared to other choral works by Jenkins such as the mass for peace The Armed Man, the demands on choir and orchestra size are moderate and make the work accessible for lay performers also.

The text is rendered in one movement but structured in sections of different character, with the first line of the text repeated in the end. The following table shows the sections with their incipit, the translation from the Book of Common Prayer, tempo marking, key and time signature, as provided in the vocal score.

Recording 

Te Deum is featured on a CD, together with Gloria, sung by the National Youth Choir of Great Britain, with the London Symphony Orchestra, conducted by the composer.

References

External links
 Charlotte Gardner: Karl Jenkins Gloria / Te Deum (London Symphony Orchestra; National Youth Choir of Great Britain; soprano: Hayley Westenra) Review BBC 2010

Compositions by Karl Jenkins
2008 compositions
Jenkins
Commissioned music